The 2010 NASCAR Corona Series was the seventh season of the Corona Series, which was organized by NASCAR Mexico. The season was composed by fourteen races. Aguascalientes was venue of the kickoff and the final event. Germán Quiroga won his second championship in row.

Report

For first time Mazda took part in a series sanctioned by NASCAR. Mazda entered with the Mazda6. TeamGP was the first team to run with this car. Mazda won its first three races and the final race in the season.

The season kickoff in Aguascalientes. Rafael Martínez began the year taking the victory. In the second race in Querétaro, Martínez won again. The third race was won by the Martínez's teammate, Jorge Goeters, in San Luis Potosí. But, Rafael Martínez had a chrash and finished in 27th place and lost the leadership of the season, and Antonio Pérez became in the new leader. The fourth race of the season was the first night race in the NCS. Tuxtla Gutiérrez was venue of this race. Salvador Durán took his first pole position and Germán Quiroga won the race. Pérez maintained the leadership of NCS. Homero Richards took the victory in the fifth race in the Autódromo Hermanos Rodríguez's oval. Richards again won in Puebla, meanwhile Pérez continued like leader.

Teams and drivers

Driver changes
 Rogelio López leave the Equipo Telcel. Alejandro Capín took his seat.
 Ricardo Pérez de Lara joined to 2b Racing since the Round 2.
 After the Round 5, Daniel Suárez replaced to Alejandro Capín in the Equipo Telcel.
 Salvador Durán was suspended after the Round 13 for aggressive driving. He was replaced by Scott Riggs.

Schedule

The schedule was presented in January comprised 14 races in 8 tracks. On May 22 Chiapas was the first night race in the NCS history. The Award ceremony was held on December 9.

Results and standings

Races

1 Qualifying cancelled by rain.
2 Qualifying cancelled by rain.

Standings

(key) Bold - Pole position awarded by time. Italics - Pole position set by final practice results or rainout. * – Most laps led.

 Goeters, Ramírez and López suffered 15 points reduction by drive shaft irregularities.

Rookie of the Year
Only the best 10 results count in the final classification.

See also
2010 NASCAR Sprint Cup Series
2010 NASCAR Nationwide Series
2010 NASCAR Camping World Truck Series
2010 NASCAR Canadian Tire Series
2010 NASCAR Mini Stock Series

References

NASCAR Corona Series

NASCAR Mexico Series